Bug Too! is a platforming video game, the sequel to Bug!. Bug Too! was originally released for the Sega Saturn on November 30, 1996, in North America, then ported to Windows on December 10.

Story
The background plot involves popular action film stars Bug, Maggot Dog, and Super Fly being signed for a six-picture deal, with all six movies being filmed in a single day.

Gameplay
Players can play as Bug, Maggot Dog, or Super Fly. Bug Too! is played like a traditional side-scrolling platform game. The player character must make his way through all the levels in each zone, with a boss level at the end of each zone. Bug Too! has 3D levels, which take the side-view and tweak it. Bug can walk sideways up vertical surfaces and even upside down.

Unlike the original Bug!, Bug Too! has a run button. The two-player mode allows players to alternate playing the game and compete for high scores.

When the player finishes a stage with at least 100 crystals collected, they are sent to one of several bonus stages. If the player collects a bonus stage's requisite number of Oscars, they earn an extra life.

Reception

Bug Too! was met with mixed reviews. Critics were generally pleased with the series additions of the run ability and new characters, though some noted that there is little gameplay difference between them and Bug. However, while the graphics in general were praised, critics found the fixed side-view camera created frustrating problems with the gameplay, such as walls obstructing the player's view of Bug and difficulty judging distances when moving between the foreground and background. The four reviewers of Electronic Gaming Monthly deemed it an overall fun title, though not a must-have. GamePros Major Mike concluded, "Bug Too! meets the expectations of its predecessor and at times exceeds them. Fans of the first game will definitely want to check it out, and for all you newcomers, it's a great time to get bugged." Lee Nutter of Sega Saturn Magazine similarly stated, "In all, Bug Too! is a top quality platform game surpassing its predecessors in all areas. But to be honest it really is just more of the same which is great if you liked the original. However, those who didn't won't find anything new to tempt them into purchasing it." A reviewer for Next Generation regarded this lack of genuine innovation over the first game to be a particularly strong strike against it, and compared the game unfavorably to contemporary Saturn platformers Nights into Dreams and Sonic 3D Blast. Jeff Gerstmann of GameSpot also compared it unfavorably to Sonic 3D Blast, and remarked, "The choice of films is far hipper than Spot Goes To Hollywood, but the game doesn't play much better."

References

External links

Gamespot Review
E3 1995 promo
Realtime Associates Official Info Page
Bug Too! at MobyGames
Defunct Games review

1996 video games
3D platform games
Realtime Associates games
Sega video games
Sega Saturn games
Video game sequels
Video games about insects
Video games about size change
Video games developed in the United States
Windows games
Multiplayer and single-player video games
Video games with pre-rendered 3D graphics